Elisabetta Preziosa (born 21 September 1993) is a former artistic gymnast from Italy. She represented her country at the 2012 Summer Olympics.

Junior career

2008 
In April, Preziosa competed at the European Championships in Clermont-Ferrand, France. She contributed an all-around score of 54.825 toward the Italian team's fifth-place finish.

In May, Preziosa competed in the senior division of the Italian Championships in Arezzo. She placed fourth in the all-around with a score of 56.000. In event finals, she placed first on balance beam, scoring 15.325, and fourth on floor, scoring 13.950.

Senior career

2009 
At the end of June, Preziosa competed at the Mediterranean Games in Pescara, Italy. She contributed an all-around score of 55.050 toward the Italian team's second-place finish. In the all-around final, she placed second with a score of 56.450.  In event finals, she placed third on balance beam, scoring 14.450, and first on floor, scoring 14.175.

In March, Preziosa competed at the City of Jesolo Trophy in Jesolo, Italy. She contributed an all-around score of 51.600 toward the Italian team's first-place finish.

In October, Preziosa competed at the World Championships in London. She placed fifth in the balance beam final with a score of 14.200.

2010 
In March, Preziosa competed at the City of Jesolo Trophy. She contributed an all-around score of 55.150 toward the Italian team's third-place finish.

At the end of April, Preziosa competed at the European Championships in Birmingham. She contributed an all-around score of 52.300 toward the Italian team's fifth-place finish. In event finals, she placed sixth on balance beam with a score of 13.075.

In October, Preziosa competed at the World Championships in Rotterdam. In the team final, she contributed scores of 13.933 on vault and 14.000 on balance beam toward the Italian team's eighth-place finish. In the all-around final, she placed twenty-fourth with a score of 52.933.

2011 
In April, Preziosa competed at the European Championships in Berlin. In qualifications, she placed nineteenth all-around with a score of 52.825 but did not move on to the final because of the two-per-country rule. In event finals, she placed third on the balance beam with a score of 14.325.

In October, Preziosa competed at the World Championships in Tokyo. She contributed scores of 14.208 on balance beam and 13.308 on floor toward the Italian team's ninth-place finish.

2012 
In January, Preziosa competed at the London Prepares series in London. She contributed scores of 14.100 on balance beam and 13.466 on floor toward the Italian team's first-place finish, which meant that they qualified a full team to the Olympics.

In June, Preziosa competed at the Italian Championships in Catania. She placed eighth in the all-around competition with a score of 51.600 and third in the floor final with a score of 13.300.

London Olympics 
At the end of July, Preziosa competed at the 2012 Summer Olympics in London. In qualification, she scored 13.733 on vault, 13.266 on balance beam, and 13.300 on floor to help the Italians qualify for the team final. In the team final, she contributed a balance beam score of 12.833 toward the Italian team's seventh-place finish.

Personal life 
Preziosa is a star of the reality television series Ginnaste - Vite Parallele on MTV Italy, which follows the lives of seven elite gymnasts who train in Milan.

Eponymous skill
Preziosa has one eponymous skill listed in the Code of Points.

References

External links 
 
 
 
 

Living people
Italian female artistic gymnasts
Olympic gymnasts of Italy
Gymnasts at the 2012 Summer Olympics
Originators of elements in artistic gymnastics
1993 births
Sportspeople from the Province of Varese
Gymnasts of Gruppo Sportivo Esercito
Mediterranean Games gold medalists for Italy
Mediterranean Games silver medalists for Italy
Mediterranean Games bronze medalists for Italy
Competitors at the 2009 Mediterranean Games
Competitors at the 2013 Mediterranean Games
Mediterranean Games medalists in gymnastics